The Guayabero River is a river of Colombia. It is primarily located in the Meta Department, forming a portion of its border with the Guaviare Department. It is part of the Orinoco River basin. Its confluence with the Ariari River gives rise to the Guaviare River, one of the Orinoco's largest tributaries.

See also
List of rivers of Colombia

References
Rand McNally, The New International Atlas, 1993.

Rivers of Colombia